Numbered roads in Queensland provides readers with basic information about the many roads in the state, particularly those for which there is no Wikipedia article. It also assists editors with the task of adding road information to existing and new road articles.

It is a list of all numbered roads in Queensland, Australia, as defined by the Department of Transport and Main Roads (TMR). The route and end-points of any numbered road can be determined by accessing the appropriate TMR map through this second reference document. There appears to be no easy way to determine which map to access for a particular road, but each map includes a numeric list of the roads to be found thereon.

The list is presented in source document sequence to facilitate updating from future versions of that document. To find a road by name first sort on name and then use the index. To arrange all occurrences of a name in number order first sort on number and then proceed as above.

Table
Except where otherwise indicated in the Notes column each road is state-controlled, and the Type field is a code for the type of network, being one of National (N), State Strategic (S), Regional (R) or District (D). Some roads are also classified as a local road of regional significance (LRRS)

See also

 List of road routes in Queensland
 List of highways in Queensland

References

Queensland,numbered
Roads in Queensland
Roads,numbered